Saecha Clarke (born 1975) is a former professional skateboarder from Huntington Beach, California. Clarke is recognized as a trailblazer in women's skateboarding.

Skateboarding career 
In 1990, at the age of 15, Clarke was sponsored by Venture, World Industries, Vans, and arise. Saecha Clarke appeared, boardsliding a rail, in Tony Hawk's Beyond column in Transworld in the March, 1991 issue.

References 

American skateboarders
Female skateboarders
Living people
American sportswomen
1975 births
21st-century American women